Ophraella bilineata is a species of skeletonizing leaf beetle in the family Chrysomelidae. It is found in North America.

References

Galerucinae
Articles created by Qbugbot
Beetles described in 1837
Taxa named by William Kirby (entomologist)